Bruno Silić (1 December 1958 – 18 January 2004) was a Croatian professional water polo player and coach.

Career
He was the coach of Jadran Split, Triglav Kranj, Glyfada and Mladost Zagreb.

He also was the coach of the senior men's Croatia national team from 1993 until 1998, winning the silver medal at the 1996 Summer Olympics in Atlanta.

Leading Mladost Zagreb, he won four Croatian Championships, two Croatian Cups, as well as the LEN Cup in 2001.

References

1958 births
2004 deaths
Croatian male water polo players
Croatian water polo coaches
Olympic coaches
Water polo players from Split, Croatia
Burials at Mirogoj Cemetery